Vrij or De Vrij may refer to:

Aldert Vrij, Dutch psychologist
Dick Vrij, Dutch mixed martial artist
James Vrij (born 1951), Dutch boxer
Stefan de Vrij (born 1992), Dutch footballer

See also
Vrij Nederland, a Dutch magazine
Het Vrije Woord (disambiguation), two Dutch-language newspapers